Wylie High School is a public high school located in Abilene, Texas, United States. It is the sole high school of the Wylie Independent School District. Wylie ISD serves the southernmost areas of Abilene, as well as the ever-growing suburbs and exurbs in east central Taylor County. WHS is one of three class 5A high schools within the city limits of Abilene, joining Abilene Independent School District schools Abilene High and Abilene Cooper. In 2008, Wylie High School was named a National Blue Ribbon School.  In 2015, the school was rated "Met Standard" by the Texas Education Agency. In 2017, the school reported an enrollment of 1,164, putting it 14 students above the number needed to realign to conference 5A.

In order to avoid confusion with the identically-named Wylie High School in the Dallas-Fort Worth Metroplex suburb of Wylie, the school is commonly referred to as Abilene Wylie.

Athletics
The Wylie Bulldogs compete in the following sports : cross country, volleyball, football, basketball, swimming, soccer, golf, tennis, track, disc golf, softball, and baseball.
UIL Lone Star Cup Champions
2001(3A), 2006(3A)

State Titles
Girls Basketball -
1970(1A), 1990(3A), 2011(3A), 2012(3A)
Football -
2004(3A/D1)
Boys Golf -
1987(3A), 1992(3A)
Team Tennis -
2013(3A), 2014(4A), 2016(4A), 2017(4A)
Volleyball -
2012(3A)
Baseball -
2016(4A), 2017(4A)

State finalists
Girls Basketball -
2001(3A), 2006(3A), 2010(3A), 2015(4A)
Football -
2000(3A/D1), 2009(3A/D1), 2016(4A/D1)
Team Tennis - 
2015(4A), 2018(5A)
Boys Basketball -
2007(3A), 2013(3A)
Baseball -
1990(3A), 1997(3A), 2002(3A), 2006(3A), 2007(3A), 2015(4A)

Football
Under the leadership of future NFL quarterback Case Keenum, the Bulldogs won their first Division 3A-1 State Championship in 2004. The Bulldogs reached two more State Championship games, but were defeated by Gilmer High School in 2009 and Carthage High School in 2016. Prior to 2004, the Bulldogs played for the state championship in 2000 but were defeated by Gatesville 14-10.

Team Tennis
Due to the above mentioned rule change Wylie, until 2018, has competed in the same conference since 1976. Wylie team tennis has actually won a total of 14 of the last 16 state tournaments. The only state wins listed above are those in UIL. UIL has only hosted a team tennis state tournament since 2013, Wylie has appeared in all of them and has won all but one. Prior to 2013 Wylie competed in the Texas Tennis Coaches Association state tournament and won 11 of their last 12 tournaments.

Band 
The Wylie High School Band is officially named the "Pure Gold Band". In 2002, with their show “New World”, the band advanced to the UIL State Marching Championship for the second time in its history and advanced to finals for the only time in its history. The semi-official theme of the band is "It Is Well", which is played at the end of every concert and football game.

Marching band

Region marching
Division 1 ranking since 1986
Celebrated 30th Division 1 ranking in 2016

Area marching
16 Area appearances 
Top three ranking in 7 contest years
1994(3A),2002(3A),2008(3A),2010(3A),2012(3A),2014(4A),2016(4A)

State marching
1994
2002 “New World” (5th place finalist)
2008 “New World Symphony”
2010 "Rhythm's Revenge"
2012 “Time”
2014 “Honor and Remember”
2016 “The Story of Our Home”

Concert bands
The Wylie Band operates an Honor band and Symphonic band during the concert season.

Notable alumni
Case Keenum, record-setting quarterback of the Houston Cougars football team, NFL quarterback for the Cleveland Browns, Minnesota Vikings, and Denver Broncos of the National Football League, and part-owner of Haak Winery
Clay Johnston, linebacker for the Cincinnati Bengals
Ty O'Neal, actor
Ernie Park, former offensive lineman for the San Diego Chargers, Miami Dolphins, Denver Broncos, and Cincinnati Bengals
Gordon Wood, 396 wins, 91 losses, and 15 ties in 43 seasons as a Texas high school head football coach

References

External links
Wylie Independent School District
Wyliegrowl.com
Wyliesports.com

High schools in Taylor County, Texas
Public high schools in Texas